Thomas Elliott Byrum (born September 28, 1960) is an American professional golfer who currently plays on the PGA Tour Champions.

Byrum was born in Onida, South Dakota. He attended the University of New Mexico and New Mexico State University before turning professional in 1984. He has played over five hundred events on the PGA Tour, with his sole victory coming at the 1989 Kemper Open. He owns two top-10 finishes in major championships: T8 in the 2002 U.S. Open at Bethpage and a 9th in the 1997 PGA Championship at Winged Foot. His older brother Curt is also a former PGA Tour winner and is now an analyst on the Golf Channel.

Professional wins (1)

PGA Tour wins (1)

PGA Tour playoff record (0–2)

Playoff record
PGA Tour Champions playoff record (0–1)

Results in major championships

CUT = missed the half-way cut
"T" = tied

Summary

Most consecutive cuts made – 4 (1997 PGA – 2002 U.S. Open)
Longest streak of top-10s – 1 (twice)

Results in The Players Championship

CUT = missed the half-way cut
"T" = tied

Results in senior major championships
Results not in chronological order before 2022.

"T" indicates a tie for a place
CUT = missed the halfway cut
NT = No tournament due to COVID-19 pandemic

See also
1985 PGA Tour Qualifying School graduates
1991 PGA Tour Qualifying School graduates
1992 PGA Tour Qualifying School graduates
1995 PGA Tour Qualifying School graduates
1996 PGA Tour Qualifying School graduates
2005 PGA Tour Qualifying School graduates

References

External links

American male golfers
New Mexico Lobos men's golfers
New Mexico State Aggies men's golfers
PGA Tour golfers
PGA Tour Champions golfers
Golfers from South Dakota
People from Sully County, South Dakota
People from Richmond, Texas
1960 births
Living people